Suwannapat Kingkaew (born 10 June 1994) is a Thai professional footballer who plays as a defender.

International career
In 2016, Suwannapat was selected in Thailand U23 squad for 2016 AFC U-23 Championship in Qatar.

Honours

Clubs
Bangkok Glass
 Thai FA Cup (1): 2014

International
Thailand U-19
 AFF U-19 Youth Championship (1): 2011

References

External links
 Profile at Goal
 S. Kingkaew soccerway

1994 births
Living people
Suwannapat Kingkaew
Suwannapat Kingkaew
Association football defenders
Suwannapat Kingkaew
Suwannapat Kingkaew
Suwannapat Kingkaew
Suwannapat Kingkaew
Suwannapat Kingkaew